A loose cannon is a hazard on the decks of a battleship, figuratively a person acting in a wild and unpredictable manner.

Loose Cannon or Loose Cannons may also refer to:

Film
 Loose Cannons (1990 film), an American comedy film
 Loose Cannons (2010 film), an Italian comedy film

Music
 Loose Cannon, a 2012 mixtape by Cashis
 "Loose Cannon" a song by Killing Joke from the 2003 album Killing Joke
 "Loose Cannons", a song by Kurupt from the 1999 album Tha Streetz Iz a Mutha
 "Loose Cannons", a song by Dr. Dre from the 2015 album Compton

Video games
 Jinx, a League of Legends and Arcane character titled "The Loose Cannon"
 Loose Cannon Studios, a defunct video game developer

Other uses
 The Loose Cannon (Jitka Harazimova, born 1975), Czech professional bodybuilder
 Loose Cannon, a 2000 novel by Dean Ing

See also

 The Loose Canon, a scriptural document of the Church of the Flying Spaghetti Monster